Narendra Manikya (d. 1695) was the Maharaja of Tripura from 1693 to 1695.

Life
Born Dwarika Thakur, he was the son of the Tripuri prince Durga Thakur, himself a son of Maharaja Govinda Manikya. Soon after his grandfather's death and the ascension of his uncle Rama Manikya in 1676, Dwarika made an attempt to claim the throne for himself. Allied with Muhammad Nasir, the Afghan chief of Sarail, Dwarika was able to dislodge Rama and assumed the regnal name Narendra Manikya. However his uncle, having found aid from the Mughal governor of Bengal, Shaista Khan, returned with the Bengali army, suppressing Narendra's rebellion and reclaiming power.

Narendra, having been captured, was taken by the Mughals to Dhaka, where he was able to eventually cultivate a friendship with Khan. Following Rama's death in 1685, his young son Ratna Manikya II inherited the throne. However, the latter earned Khan's ire after having attacked Sylhet, then under Mughal control. In response, Khan successfully invaded Tripura in 1693, with Narendra aiding in the assault. For his assistance, the governor installed the latter as ruler in his defeated cousin's place. In return, Narendra agreed to give two more elephants to the Mughals in addition to Tripura's regular tribute, with one further being exclusively presented to Khan. Narendra kept his young predecessor was by his side, whom he treated affectionately.

However, his reign proved to be short lived. Champak Ray, who had been Dewan under Ratna, fled to Dhaka to avoid capture by the new ruler. There, he, alongside Ratna's younger brother and a Tripuri general named Mir Khan, influenced Shaista Khan to provide military support against Narendra. They led a large invasion force into Tripura and, in the sanguinary Battle of Chandigarh, defeated Narendra. The latter was subsequently killed, having had reigned for about three years, with the throne then being restored to Ratna.

Notes

References

Kings of Tripura
History of Tripura
1695 deaths